Vezzani is a commune on the island of Corsica and an Italian surname. Notable people with the surname include:

César Vezzani (1888–1951), French/Corsican tenor
Roberto Vezzani (born 1942), Italian weightlifter

Surnames of Italian origin
Italian-language surnames